Shade is an unincorporated community in Pemiscot County, in the U.S. state of Missouri.

The community has the name of E. W. Shade, a local businessman.

References

Unincorporated communities in Pemiscot County, Missouri
Unincorporated communities in Missouri